Dorchester Township (T7N R7W) is located in Macoupin County, Illinois, United States. As of the 2010 census, its population was 1,550 and it contained 652 housing units.

Geography

Demographics

Adjacent townships
 Gillespie Township (north)
 Cahokia Township (northeast)
 Mount Olive Township (east)
 Staunton Township (east)
 Olive Township, Madison County (southeast)
 Omphghent Township, Madison County (south)
 Bunker Hill Township (west)
 Hillyard Township (northwest)

References

External links
City-data.com
Illinois State Archives

Townships in Macoupin County, Illinois
Townships in Illinois